Sunnybatrachus is a genus of extinct frog that lived during the Berriasian epoch of the Early Cretaceous of England. The only known material, including the holotype ilium as well as bones of the skull, vertebral column, forelimb, pelvis, and hindlimb was named Sunnybatrachus purbeckensis by Susan E. Evans and Gerard J. McGowan in 2002. The species name describes the Purbeck Limestone Group, while the genus name is for the Sunnydown Farm locality of the Lulworth Formation, where the fossils were found.

References

Early Cretaceous frogs
Fossil taxa described in 2002
Taxa named by Susan E. Evans